Västerby may refer to:

 Länsikylä, Pyhtää
 Västerby, Sweden